Akemi Nishiya-Kinoshita (born 11 March 1965) is a former professional tennis player from Japan.

Biography 
Nishiya, who comes from Tokyo, played collegiate tennis at Pepperdine University in 1984.

As a singles player on the professional tour she reached a highest ranking of 112 in the world. She had a win over Pascale Paradis at the 1988 Australian Open and also competed in the main draws of the French Open and Wimbledon Championships. On the WTA Tour her best singles performance was a quarter-final appearance at the 1988 OTB Open, held in Schenectady.

Her only WTA title came in doubles, partnering Kerry-Anne Guse at the 1991 Volvo San Marino Open. They defeated top seeds Laura Garrone and Mercedes Paz in the final. She was ranked as high as 61 in doubles and appeared in the main draw of all four grand slam tournaments.

Since being married she is known as Akemi Kinoshita and she is now a New York based tennis coach.

WTA Tour finals

Doubles (1-1)

ITF finals

Singles (1–1)

Doubles (1–2)

References

External links 
 
 

1965 births
Living people
Japanese female tennis players
Pepperdine Waves women's tennis players
Japanese emigrants to the United States
Sportspeople from Tokyo
20th-century Japanese women
21st-century Japanese women